Gundabooka Parish  is a civil parish, of Yanda County, a cadasteral division of New South Wales;  a Cadastral division of New South Wales.

Location
The Parish is on the Darling River upstream of Louth, New South Wales and down stream of Bourke, New South Wales and is located at 30°48′57″S 145°48′36″E.

Geography
The topography is flat with a Köppen climate classification of BsK (Hot semi arid). The climate is characterised by hot summers and mild winters. The
annual average rainfall is 350 mm, although this is highly variable.

Much of the Parish is in the Gundabooka National Park and adjoining conservation area.

Etymology
Gunderbooka is believed to be derived from a local Aboriginal word and is also the name of Gundabook Station.

History
The traditional owners of the area are the Ngamba and Barkindji peoples The first European to the area was Thomas Mitchell (explorer).

See also
Gunderbooka County

References

Central West (New South Wales)
Localities in New South Wales
Geography of New South Wales
Populated places in New South Wales